Rubber Soul (Hangul: 러버소울) is a South Korean hip hop duo. The all-female group debuted as a trio in 2015 with the single "Life," featuring Mad Clown. After the departure of Lala, the group released their first EP, Love Is, in 2017. The name was based on the 1965 studio album of the English group The Beatles called Rubber Soul.

Members

 Choi Cho (Hangul: 최초; born May 10, 1992) - vocals
 Kim (Hangul: 김; born May 18, 1993) - vocals

Past member

 Lala (Hangul: 라라; November 15, 1990) - vocals

Career
Rubber Soul debuted in 2015 as a joint project of record labels Universal Music, Happy Tribe Entertainment, and With HC. They performed their first single, "Life," for the first time on February 10, 2015, on SBS MTV's The Show. This marked their official debut and the group continued promotions on various shows for a few months with both "Life" and their side-track "Lonely Friday" with features Mad Soul Child's Jinsil.

Rubber Soul continued to promote their singles via street performances in Hongdae, as well as performing lives of unreleased songs such as "Choice" and "Beautiful Woman".

In February, they took part in SNL Korea 6 as guest members on episode 1.

The trio also participated in a pictorial in Dazed magazine in April.

The group performed alongside other Korean artists such as MYNAME, G-Friend, Galaxy Express, T-ARA, MAMAMOO and others in September for the Asian Music Network festival.

In October, 2015, the group participated alongside Giriboy, Black Nut and Genius Nochang in a "1st Look" pictorial for Vans and the winter collection "Designed for the Elements".

Solo activities
Kim participated in the reality show Unpretty Rapstar 2 as a contestant starting with episode 6. Kim was also a contestant on The Unit.

Discography

Extended play

Singles

References

2015 establishments in South Korea
K-pop music groups
Musical groups established in 2015
South Korean girl groups